Frederick Watson (30 November 1888 – 29 June 1917) was a Scottish professional football wing half who played in the Scottish League for Aberdeen.

Personal life 
Watson served as a trimmer in the Royal Naval Reserve during the First World War and died of heart failure on 29 June 1917. He was buried in St. Peter's Cemetery, Aberdeen.

Career statistics

References 

Scottish footballers
1917 deaths
British military personnel killed in World War I
Royal Naval Volunteer Reserve personnel of World War I
Scottish Football League players
Association football wing halves
Aberdeen F.C. players
Footballers from Aberdeen
1888 births
Royal Navy sailors
Royal Naval Reserve personnel